Mamre is a small rural town in the Western Cape province of South Africa. It is situated on the northernmost border of the City of Cape Town Metropolitan Municipality.

History

Mamre was established as a village and mission station in 1808 by Moravian missionaries. It was at first known as Groene Kloof (Green Gorge) after the Dutch East India Company post established there in 1701 and abandoned in 1791. It was subsequently renamed after the biblical Mamre (Gen. 13:18), a name said to mean "fattiness".

In December 1962, Looksmart Ngudle and Denis Goldberg helped to organise an Umkhonto we Sizwe training camp at Mamre, later recognised as the first MK training centre inside South Africa; however it had to be abandoned early due to Security Police interest.

References

Populated places in the City of Cape Town
1808 establishments in Africa